Shab is a 2017 Indian romantic drama film directed by Onir and produced by Sanjay Suri and Onir for Anticlock Films, WSG Pictures and Surya Entertainment. It stars Raveena Tandon, Arpita Chatterjee, Ashish Bisht, Simon Frenay, Gaurav Nanda and Areesz Ganddi.

The filmed was screened at the New York Indian Film Festival on 1 May 2017, and its projected Indian release date of 30 June was postponed to 14 July 2017.

The film's trailer was released on 17 May 2017 in India.

Synopsis
This film is about lives of people who live on the edge of what society finds acceptable. It is about coming to terms with oneself and accepting other people as they are. The film is set in the cosmopolitan city of Delhi where people from all over the country come to fulfill their dreams. For some, these dreams are realized, while others remain in an endless pursuit of other elusive dreams. Perhaps it is the hope of ultimately reaching that destination that keeps one going. And then there are others who surrender to the overwhelming power of the city of dreams and get lost in the maze.
This film is the story of a coffee shop girl Raina and the man who loves her Afzar an aspiring model. Sonal is a fashion patron who becomes his mentor. The film centers around their intense relationship. Love, hurt and power. Into their lives comes in Benoit a French expat who teaches French in Delhi.

Cast
 Arpita Chatterjee as Raina 
 Raveena Tandon as Sonal Modi
 Ashish Bisht as Mohan/Afzar
 Gaurav Nanda as Baljeet 
 Raj Suri as Rohan
 Sanjay Suri as Vivek Modi
 Simon Frenay as Benoit

Music

The music for Shab is created by Mithoon with lyrics by Amitabh S. Verma and Mithoon. The soundtrack will be released by Tips Music. Background score is created by Shashwat Srivastava.

Reception
Filmfare rated the film with 3 stars saying that the film is worth a watch due to the maturity and the subtlety of handling the subject by director Onir, but Koimoi gave the film only 1.5 stars saying that it's not a family entertainer everyone would like to watch and enjoy. They also wrote, the film might satisfy those who enjoys the stories dealing with complexities of urban life relationships. Deccan Chronicle offered that the film had great characters lost within a poor narrative, writing "Onir has a brilliant take on homosexuality and he beautifully weaves it into his films each time, but it all goes haywire in this one. The most worthless thing in the film is its cheesy dialogues."

References

External links
 

2010s Hindi-language films
2017 films
Indian drama films
Indian LGBT-related films
Films shot in Delhi
Films set in Delhi
2017 LGBT-related films
2017 drama films
Hindi-language drama films
LGBT-related drama films